William Valentine (October 8, 1867 – August 29, 1932) was an American archer. He competed in the men's double American round at the 1904 Summer Olympics.

References

External links

1867 births
1932 deaths
American male archers
Olympic archers of the United States
Archers at the 1904 Summer Olympics
People from Lexington, Illinois